Pseudoxanthobacter liyangensis is a Gram-negative, rod-shaped, nitrogen fixing aerobic bacterium which has been isolated from soil in Liyang in China.

References

Further reading 
 

Hyphomicrobiales
Bacteria described in 2014